The 2020 season was the Carolina Panthers' 26th in the National Football League and their first under head coach Matt Rhule. The offseason saw several notable departures; Quarterback Cam Newton was released after the Panthers were unable to find a team willing to trade for him, while linebacker Luke Kuechly announced his retirement on January 14, 2020. On December 21, 2020 the Panthers parted ways with GM Marty Hurney after a total of 19 seasons with the organization.

With a loss to the Vikings in week 12, the Panthers secured their third consecutive non-winning season. After losing their first two games and winning the next three, the Panthers suffered a five-game losing streak before beating the Lions in week 11 and losing to the Vikings before their bye week. After their week 15 loss to the Packers, Carolina was eliminated from the playoffs for the third consecutive season. With the loss to the Saints in week 17, the Panthers matched their 5–11 record from the previous season.

Draft

Draft trades

Carolina traded their third- and fifth- round selections (69th and 148th) to Seattle in exchange for their second round selection (64th)
Carolina traded quarterback Kyle Allen to Washington for their fifth-round selection (152nd overall)

Staff

Final roster

Preseason
The Panthers' preseason schedule was announced on May 7, but was later cancelled due to the COVID-19 pandemic.

Regular season

Schedule
The Panthers' 2020 schedule was announced on May 7.

Note: Intra-division opponents are in bold text.

Game summaries

Week 1: vs. Las Vegas Raiders

In the Panther's home opener, they came close to beating the Las Vegas Raiders until a Raiders touchdown at the end of the fourth quarter. The Panthers, facing a 4th and 1 near midfield, gave the ball to FB Alexander Armah who was stuffed at the line of scrimmage, resulting in a turnover on downs; they were criticized for not giving the ball to McCaffrey. The Panthers lost 30–34 and started off the season 0–1.

Week 2: at Tampa Bay Buccaneers

Carolina traveled down south to Tampa Bay to face their new quarterback, Tom Brady. It was a scoreless first half for the Panthers while Tampa Bay managed to score 21 points. In the third Christian McCaffrey put points up on the board for Carolina. He again scored another touchdown early in the fourth decreasing the lead to seven. Soon after he left the game with a sprained ankle. Tampa Bay and Carolina then both scored field goals. Leonard Fournette ran up the field 46-yards for a Bucs touchdown. The Buccaneers defeat the Panthers 31–17. With this loss, the Panthers suffered their second consecutive 0–2 start.

Week 3: at Los Angeles Chargers

The Panthers were able to hold off the Chargers and defeat them 21–16, improving to 1–2. With this win they snapped a 10-game losing streak dating back to week 9 of last season.

Week 4: vs. Arizona Cardinals

The Panthers started the game off with scoring two touchdowns by Mike Davis and Teddy Bridgewater in the first quarter. In the second Arizona's Patrick Peterson intercepted a pass intended for Ian Thomas. Kyler Murray threw a three-yard pass to Jordan Thomas resulting in a Cardinals touchdown. Kyler Murray fumbles the ball in the third quarter and it was recovered by Carolina. The Panthers score with another Ian Thomas touchdown. Arizona answers back with a touchdown. Joey Slye kicks a field goal for Carolina, and Chase Edmonds scores a touchdown for Arizona in the fourth. Panthers win 31–21 and improve to 2–2.

Ahead of this matchup, the Panthers announced that they would be deploying robotic technology to disinfect areas around their stadium and locker room as an effort to keep fans and players safe from COVID-19.

Week 5: at Atlanta Falcons

The Panthers defeat the Falcons 23–16, and improve to 3–2. This was also the team's first win in Atlanta since 2014.

Week 6: vs. Chicago Bears

Chicago beats Carolina 23–16, and the Panthers fall to 3–3.

Week 7: at New Orleans Saints

It was another close one for the Panthers but they ended up losing to Saints 24–27 after Joey Slye missed a tying field goal, and fall to 3–4. This was quarterback Teddy Bridgewater's first return to New Orleans since leaving the team via free agency during the offseason.

Week 8: vs. Atlanta Falcons

Week 9: at Kansas City Chiefs

Week 10: vs. Tampa Bay Buccaneers

Week 11: vs. Detroit Lions

This was the Panthers' first shutout win since Week 14 of 2015. It was also QB P.J. Walker's first NFL start.

Week 12: at Minnesota Vikings

In the final minutes of the game, the Panthers had a 27-21 lead over Minnesota. However, Kirk Cousins threw the game-winning touchdown with 46 seconds left.

Week 14: vs. Denver Broncos

With this loss, the Carolina Panthers are 1-6 in their last 7 games vs Denver

Week 15: at Green Bay Packers

Week 16: at Washington Football Team

With the win against the Washington Football Team, the Panthers recorded their 200th win in franchise history.

Week 17: vs. New Orleans Saints

Standings

Division

Conference

References

External links
 

Carolina
Carolina Panthers seasons
Carolina Panthers